Zoombak Inc was a U.S.-based company which developed GPS tracking devices for people and items. It used satellite-enabled GPS and a location network server for tracking. In 2011, Securus, Inc. acquired Zoombak, LLC from TruePosition, Inc., a subsidiary of Liberty Media.

In March 2015 it was announced that BrickHouse Security acquired Securus, including Zoombak and related brands.

References

External links
BrickHouse Security website

2006 establishments in New York City
Technology companies established in 2006
Companies based in New York City
Global Positioning System
American companies established in 2006